Lehi is a city in Utah County, Utah, United States. It is named after Lehi, a prophet in the Book of Mormon. The population was 75,907 at the 2020 census, up from 47,407 in 2010. The rapid growth in Lehi is due, in part, to the rapid development of the tech industry region known as Silicon Slopes. The center of population of Utah is located in Lehi.

History

A group of Mormon pioneers settled the area now known as Lehi in the fall of 1850 at a place called Dry Creek in the northernmost part of Utah Valley. It was renamed Evansville in 1851 after David Evans, a local bishop in the Church of Jesus Christ of Latter-day Saints. Other historical names include Sulphur Springs and Snow's Springs.

There was little water to irrigate the rich soil, so it became necessary to divert a portion of American Fork Creek. Evansville consumed up to one-third of the creek's water, as authorized by the Utah Territorial Legislature.

The settlement grew so rapidly that, in early 1852, Bishop Evans petitioned the Utah Territorial Legislature to incorporate the settlement. Lehi City was incorporated by legislative act on February 5, 1852. It was the sixth city incorporated in Utah. The legislature also approved a request to call the new city Lehi, after a Book of Mormon prophet of the same name. The first mayor of Lehi was Silas P. Barnes, from 1853-1854.

The downtown area has been designated the Lehi Main Street Historic District by the National Park Service and is on the National Register of Historic Places.

Geography

Climate

Demographics

Lehi is part of the Provo–Orem metropolitan area.

As of the American Community Survey (ACS) Demographic and Housing Estimates of 2016, there were 56,314 people living in the city with 14,853 housing units. The estimated racial makeup of the city was 94.6% European American, 0.1% African American, 0.5% Native American, 1.2% Asian, 0.2% Pacific Islander, 1.3% from other races, and 2.1% from two or more races. Hispanic or Latino of any race were 6.5% of the population. An estimated 51.2% of the population was male with 48.8% female. The median age as of 2016 was 24.7.

According to the 2010 Census, there were 12,402 households, out of which 61.0% had children under the age of 18 living with them, 78.4% were husband-wife families living together, 3.2% had a male householder with no wife present, 7.1% had a female householder with no husband present, and 11.3% were non-families. 9.0% of all households were made up of individuals (living alone) and 11.7% had someone living alone who was 65 years of age or older. The average household size was 3.81 and the average family size was 4.08.

As of 2018, the median income for a household in Lehi was $74,200, and the median income for a family was $88,278. The per capita income for the city was $25,894, including all adults and children. The unemployment rate for Lehi was 3.0%. The job growth rate was at 2.6% and was expected to grow 54.8% over the next 10 years.

Economy

Lehi has been transitioning from an agricultural economy to a technological economy. This first started with the lengthy construction of a DRAM microchip plant by Micron Technology, which eventually evolved into a NAND flash memory business called IM Flash Technologies that was founded by both Micron and the Intel Corporation with headquarters in Lehi. In 2013, 1 out of every 14 flash memory chips in the world was produced in Lehi. On June 30th, 2021, Texas Instruments announced that they would be purchasing this facility.

Adobe Systems based one of its U.S. buildings in Lehi, which is home to about 900 employees. According to the Adobe website, "The team in Utah is focused on engineering, product development, sales, marketing, and operations for the industry-leading Adobe Marketing Cloud."

IASIS Healthcare built Lehi's first hospital, which opened in June 2015. The company broke ground for the medical center in February 2014. The 23-acre campus houses a 40-bed, full-service facility with an emergency department, intensive care unit, medical imaging, cardiac lab, surgical suites, and labor and delivery.

Ancestry.com moved its headquarters from Provo to Lehi in May 2016. The headquarters building is located in The Corporate Center at Traverse Mountain.

Microsoft has an engineering department specializing in the next version of its MDOP (Microsoft Desktop Optimization Pack), code-named "Park City." Initially employing 100, Microsoft has built a second building to house its staff. Microsoft Southwest District is located at 3400 N. Ashton Blvd., Suite 300 Lehi, Utah 84043.

Other Thanksgiving Park tenants are Oracle Corporation, Infusionsoft, Workfront, Vivint Solar, Agel Enterprises, DigiCert, Jolt and ProPay Inc.

Multi-level marketing companies XanGo, Young Living, Younique, Nature's Sunshine Products also have offices in Lehi.

Fixed wireless internet service provider (ISP) WeLink is based in Lehi.

Arts and culture

Attractions

Lehi Roller Mills

Lehi Roller Mills was founded in 1906 by a co-op of farmers. George G. Robinson purchased the mill in 1910, and it has since remained in the Robinson family, currently run by George's grandson, R. Sherman Robinson.  The mill produces some 100,000 pounds of flour each day.

The turkey and peacock flour paintings of Lehi Roller Mills were painted on the silos about 1930 by Stan Russon of Lehi, Utah. He used a rope and pulley system to manually raise and lower himself to be able to paint.

Lehi Roller Mills was featured in the 1984 film Footloose as Ren McCormack's workplace and as the site of the dance.  At the time the film was made, Lehi Roller Mills was surrounded by nothing but vacant fields. In one scene, the Reverend Shaw Moore and his wife Vi Moore keep a wary eye on the proceedings while standing in a field some distance away. The area is now home to a variety of fast food restaurants and a shopping center.

The Lehi Roller Mills were listed on the U.S. National Register of Historic Places in 1994.

In 2012, the Mills filed for bankruptcy with the intention of continuing to operate during the proceedings.

Thanksgiving Point

Thanksgiving Point is a nonprofit museum complex and estate garden founded in 1995. It consists of six main attractions: the Ashton Gardens, Thanksgiving Point Golf Course, the Museum of Ancient Life, the Museum of Natural Curiosity, Farm Country, and the Butterfly Biosphere. Approximately 1.45 million people visit Thanksgiving Point each year. It is also a location for Megaplex Theaters and has several restaurants and gift shops. It is the site for the region's only Tulip Festival, an annual Scottish Festival, annual Cornbelly's Halloween attraction, and Highland Games.

The complex is a 501(c)(3) organization with operations funded by private donations, venue and event admissions, and profits from shops and restaurants.

Hutchings Museum
The Hutchings Museum is a museum located near the center of Lehi. It was first established in 1955 in what is now the Lehi arts building. The museum later moved to 55 N Center St, Lehi, UT, its current location. The collection was donated to Lehi city from John and Eunice Hutchings, who were  amateur collectors and naturalists.

Originally designed to be a memorial for the veterans in WW1 and has continued to expand to become many things: Library, Courthouse, Jail, Police Station, Fire Station, and some others.

The Hutchings Museum's exhibits include a large range of displays and artifacts from Native American Culture, Rocks and Minerals, Veteran's Memorial, Lehi History, History of the Wild West, and much more.

Some of the Museum's most notable artifacts are Butch Cassidy's Gun, their large collection of rocks and minerals, and Native American pottery.
 The museum has online articles, photos, videos, 3-D video, and a virtual tour.

Education
Lehi public schools are part of the Alpine School District. Alpine School District has two high schools (Lehi High School  and Skyridge High School), three junior high or middle schools, and ten elementary schools in the city.

Mountainland Technical College (MTECH) is a public technical training institution located in Lehi.  MTECH serves high school and adult students at the Lehi location, offering programs of study in automotive, culinary arts, healthcare, information technology and a growing number of other industry and technical programs. MTECH offers community education programs such as training in basic computer skills and specific software programs and partners with many area employers in providing customized training for their employees through the Custom Fit program.

Challenger School is located in Lehi, in the Traverse Mountain area.

Infrastructure

Transportation
I-15 runs through Lehi, with five exits (at American Fork Main St/SR-145, Lehi Main St/SR-73, 2100 North/SR-194, Triumph Blvd, and Timpanogos Highway/SR-92) located in the city. The Utah Transit Authority operates a bus system that reaches into the city. Work on the FrontRunner South commuter rail began in August 2008, and the Lehi station opened for service on December 12, 2012. The Lehi station is located near Thanksgiving Point.

I-15 construction
Beginning in the spring of 2018, the Utah Department of Transportation (UDOT) began major reconstruction of the I-15 between Lehi Main Street and SR-92 (Timpanogos Highway). The project is contracted to be completed by October 2020 and updates can be found online.

Notable people
 Garett Bolles, lineman for NFL's Denver Broncos
 Connor Boyack, outspoken libertarian advocate and author of the children's book series, The Tuttle Twins; founder of The Libertas Institute (headquartered in Lehi)
 Wilford Brimley, actor
 Paul Cummings, Olympic runner, half-marathon (former) world record holder
 Tony Finau, professional golfer playing on the PGA Tour
 Porter Rockwell, bodyguard to Joseph Smith and Brigham Young
 Eldred G. Smith, Patriarch to the Church for The Church of Jesus Christ

See also

 List of cities and towns in Utah
 Wines Park

References

Further reading
.
.
.
.
.
.
.
.
.
.

External links

 Official website
 Lehi Historical Society & Archives

 
Cities in Utah
Populated places established in 1850
Provo–Orem metropolitan area
1850 establishments in Utah Territory
Cities in Utah County, Utah